Garhi Ajit Singh is a village in Shaheed Bhagat Singh Nagar district of Punjab State, India. The village is administrated by Sarpanch an elected representative of the village.

Demography 
As of 2011, Garhi Ajit Singh has a total number of 351 houses and population of 1641 of which 813 include are males while 823 are females according to the report published by Census India in 2011. The literacy rate of Garhi Ajit Singh is 79.30%, higher than the state average of 75.84%. The population of children under the age of 6 years is 187 which is 11.40% of total population of Garhi Ajit Singh, and child sex ratio is approximately 968 as compared to Punjab state average of 846.

Most of the people are from Schedule Caste which constitutes 49.18% of total population in Garhi Ajit Singh. The town does not have any Schedule Tribe population so far.

As per the report published by Census India in 2011, 430 people were engaged in work activities out of the total population of Garhi Ajit Singh which includes 410 males and 20 females. According to census survey report 2011, 59.07% workers describe their work as main work and 40.93% workers are involved in Marginal activity providing livelihood for less than 6 months.

Education 
The village has a Punjabi medium, co-ed primary school founded in 1954. The schools does not provide mid-day meal. The school provide free education to children between the ages of 6 and 14 as per Right of Children to Free and Compulsory Education Act. KC Engineering College and Doaba Khalsa Trust Group Of Institutions are the nearest colleges.

Transport 

See also 
List of villages in India

References

External links 
 Tourism of Punjab
 Census of Punjab
 Locality Based PINCode

Villages in Shaheed Bhagat Singh Nagar district